Chile is a South American country occupying a long, narrow strip of land between the Andes to the east and the Pacific Ocean to the west. It borders Peru to the north, Bolivia to the northeast, Argentina to the east, and the Drake Passage in the far south. Chilean territory includes the Pacific islands of Juan Fernández, Salas y Gómez, Desventuradas, and Easter Island in Oceania. 

Chile is today one of South America's most stable and prosperous nations. It leads Latin American nations in rankings of human development, competitiveness, income per capita, globalization, state of peace, economic freedom, and low perception of corruption. It also ranks high regionally in sustainability of the state, and democratic development. Chile is a founding member of the United Nations, the Union of South American Nations (UNASUR) and the Community of Latin American and Caribbean States (CELAC).

Notable firms 
This list includes notable companies with primary headquarters located in the country. The industry and sector follow the Industry Classification Benchmark taxonomy. Organizations which have ceased operations are included and noted as defunct.

See also
 List of airlines of Chile
 List of banks in Chile
 List of newspapers in Chile
 List of shopping malls in Chile

References 

 
Chile